The Waldorf Warriors football program is a college football team that represents Waldorf College in the Mid-States Football Association, a part of the National Association of Intercollegiate Athletics.  The team has had 5 head coaches since its first recorded football game in 2003. The current coach is Will Finley who first took the position for the 2020 season.

Key

Coaches

Notes

References

Lists of college football head coaches

Iowa sports-related lists